Ronald James Gould (born April 15, 1950) is an American mathematician specializing in combinatorics and graph theory.  He is a Goodrich C. White professor emeritus in the Emory University Department of Mathematics.

Education and career
After attending SUNY Fredonia for his undergraduate degree, Gould received his Ph.D. in 1979 from Western Michigan University.  His thesis was titled Traceability in Graphs, and was completed under the supervision of Gary Chartrand.  He spent a short period as a lecturer at San Jose State University in 1978 and 1979, then moved to Emory University in 1979.  He was named to the Goodrich C. White professorship in 2001, and retired in 2016.

Gould is most noted for his work in the area of Hamiltonian graph theory.  His book Mathematics in Games, Sports, and Gambling: The Games People Play won the American Library Association award for Outstanding Academic Titles, 2010.  Gould has over 180 mathematical publications, and has advised 28 Ph.D. students.

References

External links
 Ron Gould's homepage at Emory University

Living people
1950 births
Graph theorists
20th-century American mathematicians
21st-century American mathematicians
Western Michigan University alumni
Emory University faculty
Place of birth missing (living people)